Newspaper Boy may refer to:

Paperboy, a boy who delivers newspapers
Newspaper Boy (1955 film), Indian Malayalam movie
Newspaper Boy (1997 film), Indian Malayalam movie